The Flight Before Christmas may refer to:

The Flight Before Christmas (2008 film)
The Flight Before Christmas (2015 film)
Shaun the Sheep: The Flight Before Christmas, a 2021 Shaun the Sheep special